Dag Klaveness (29 August 1945 – 20 October 2020) was a Norwegian limnologist.

He was born in Sandefjord. After taking his cand.real. degree in marine botany at the University of Oslo in 1971, he was hired as a lecturer at the University of Oslo in 1974, and in 1992 promoted to professor. He died in October 2020 in Oslo.

References

1945 births
2020 deaths
People from Sandefjord
Norwegian limnologists
University of Oslo alumni
Academic staff of the University of Oslo